The 1929 Arizona Wildcats football team represented the University of Arizona as an independent during the 1929 college football season. In their fifteenth season under head coach Pop McKale, the Wildcats compiled a 7–1 record and outscored their opponents 182 to 22, with six shutouts. The team captain was Wendell P. Acuff.

The 1929 team was the first to play at the new Arizona Stadium in Tucson; the first game was a 35–0 victory over Caltech on October 12.

Schedule

 Friday night (September 27), Thursday (November 28, Thanksgiving)

References

Arizona
Arizona Wildcats football seasons
Arizona Wildcats football